Some Things Don't Come Easy is the sixth album by the pop rock duo England Dan & John Ford Coley.

Track listing
"Some Things Don't Come Easy" (Dan Seals) - 4:22       
"If The World Ran Out Of Love Tonight" (Michael Garvin, Blake Mevis, Admiral S. Clay Wilson, Kelly Wilson) - 3:03   
"You Can't Dance" (Tim Ryan, Bob Yeomans) - 2:56
"Who's Lonely Now" (John Ford Coley, Seals) - 3:19
"Hold Me" (Coley, Bob Gundry, Simon Waltzer) - 3:32      
"We'll Never Have to Say Goodbye Again" (Jeffrey Comanor) - 2:49     
"Lovin' Somebody on a Rainy Night" (Dave Loggins) - 3:24
"Beyond the Tears" (Comanor, Gundry) - 3:45
"Calling For You Again" (Coley,  Gundry) - 2:44
"Wanting You Desperately" (Seals) - 3:55
"Just the Two of Us" (Coley,  Seals) - 2:20

Personnel
 Dan Seals – lead and backing vocals, acoustic guitar, electric guitar
 John Ford Coley – lead and backing vocals, acoustic guitar, keyboards
 Johnny Christopher – acoustic guitar
 Steve Gibson – acoustic guitar, electric guitar
 Bobby Thompson – acoustic guitar
 Doyle Grisham – steel guitar
 Shane Keister – keyboards
 Bobby Emmons – organ
 Joe Osborn – bass 
 Jack Williams – bass
 Larrie Londin – drums 
 Farrell Morris – percussion 
 Gove Scrivenor – autoharp 
 Cindy Reynolds – harp
 Harvey Thompson – saxophone solo
 Muscle Shoals Horns – horns 
 Billy Puett – woodwinds
 Bergen White – string arrangements 
 The Shelly Kurland Strings – strings 
 Sheri Kramer – backing vocals 
 Lisa Silver – backing vocals 
 Diane Tidwell – backing vocals 
 Vicki Lehning – backing vocals (11)

Production
 Producer – Kyle Lehning 
 Engineers – Kyle Lehning and Marshall Morgan 
 Assistant Engineer – Tom Knox
 Recorded at Studio By The Pond (Hendersonville, TN).
 Mixed by Elliot Scheiner at A&R Studios (New York, NY), assisted by Ed Rak.
 Mastered by Glenn Meadows at Masterfonics (Nashville, TN).
 Photography – Alan Bergman
 Management – Susan Joseph

Charts

References

1978 albums
England Dan & John Ford Coley albums
Albums produced by Kyle Lehning
Big Tree Records albums